The Central African Forest Commission (French: Commission des Forêts d'Afrique Centrale, or COMIFAC) is an intergovernmental organisation in Central Africa. Its goal is to manage the forests of Central Africa in a sustainable manner and is supported by the wildlife trade monitoring network TRAFFIC  The secretariat is based in Yaoundé, Cameroon. Raymond Mbitikon serves as its Executive Secretary.

Its four official languages are French, English, Spanish and Portuguese.

Member states 

The Central African Forest Commission's ten member states are:
 
 Burundi
 Cameroon
 Chad
 Central African Republic
 Democratic Republic of the Congo
 Equatorial Guinea
 Gabon
 Republic of the Congo
 Rwanda
 São Tomé and Príncipe

History 

COMIFAC was established in March 1999, through the "Declaration of Yaoundé". In February 2005, the organization adopted a "Convergence Plan for improved management and conservation of forests in Central Africa."

OFAC 

Established in 2007, the Central African Forest Observatory (OFAC) is a specialized unit of the COMIFAC, which provides up-to-date and relevant data on the forests and ecosystems of the region, with the aim of informing policy-making and to promote better governance and sustainable management of natural resources.

See also

 Congo Basin Forest Partnership
 Dzanga-Sangha Special Reserve
 Economic and Monetary Community of Central Africa
 Lobéké National Park
 Nouabalé-Ndoki National Park

References

External links 
 Comifac.org

Forestry in Africa
Forestry agencies
Central Africa
Intergovernmental environmental organizations
Environmental organizations based in Cameroon
Environmental organizations established in 1999
1999 establishments in Cameroon